Vashu Bhagnani is an Indian film producer from Mumbai, India who works in Bollywood film industry.

He launched Puja Entertainment India Ltd. in 1995 with the movie Coolie No. 1 His films include Coolie No. 1 (1995), Hero No. 1 (1997), Bade Miyan Chote Miyan (1998), Mujhe Kucch Kehna Hai (2001), Rehnaa Hai Terre Dil Mein (2002), Om Jai Jagadish (2002), and Shaadi No. 1 (2005). . His recent ventures are Kal Kissne Dekha (2009) and F.A.L.T.U (2011).

Personal life
Bhagnani is of Sindhi descent. He is the son of Lilaram Bhagnani and is married to Pooja Bhagnani. His son Jackky Bhagnani acted in some films produced by him.

Production 
 
Films produced by Bhagnani :

References

External links
 

Film producers from Kolkata
Sindhi people
Living people
Hindi film producers
Year of birth missing (living people)